The First Counsel is a 2001 novel written by Brad Meltzer about a young White House attorney who becomes ensnared in a deadly conspiracy after he gets close to the President's daughter. It is because of the First Daughter that he is accused of a murder he did not commit. But only with her help is he able to clear his name. According to WorldCat, the book is in 2153 libraries.

Plot 
Nora Hartson, the President's daughter, is code-named Shadow. A young White House attorney, Michael Garrick, begins dating her. Michael thinks he can handle the world where Norah's closest friends wear earpieces and carry guns, where his every move is watched, and in which his girlfriend's father is the most powerful man alive. Michael is accused of a murder he did not commit and in order to clear his name, he must unravel a secret that will shake the foundation of the Oval Office.

References

External links 
 http://bradmeltzer.com/book/the-first-counsel/

2001 American novels
Books by Brad Meltzer